Wichabai is a community in the Upper Takutu-Upper Essequibo Region of Guyana, located at , altitude 157 metres. Wichabai is a cattle ranch in the Rupununi savannah caters to eco-tourism. The ranch can be reached from Wichabai Airport.

References

Populated places in Upper Takutu-Upper Essequibo